Alyson Best (born September 29, 1960) is an Australian actress known for her appearance in Prisoner (1983) and Man of Flowers (1983). In 1979 she appeared in a famous photo with Derryn Hinch in Playboy.

Select Credits
Young Ramsay (1980) - episode "Waltzing Matilda"
Harlequin (1980)
Pacific Banana (1980)
 Bellamy (1980) (TV series) ‘The Best Damned Killer In The Country’
Holiday Island (1981) (TV series)
At Last... Bullamakanka: The Motion Picture (1982)
Brothers (1982)
Man of Flowers (1983)
Prisoner (1983) (TV series)
 Relatives (1985)
Kindred (1985) (short film)

References

External links

Actresses from New South Wales
1960 births
Living people